Julian Spence (born 7 March 1986) is an Australian long-distance runner. In 2019, he competed in the men's marathon at the 2019 World Athletics Championships held in Doha, Qatar. He finished in 39th place.

In 2018, he competed in the 2018 Berlin Marathon held in Berlin, Germany.

References

External links 
 

Living people
1986 births
Place of birth missing (living people)
Australian male long-distance runners
Australian male marathon runners
World Athletics Championships athletes for Australia
21st-century Australian people